Teenage Mutant Ninja Turtles: The Original Motion Picture Soundtrack is the licensed soundtrack to the 1990 New Line Cinema film Teenage Mutant Ninja Turtles. It was released by SBK Records on March 16, 1990. The collection is made up mostly of hip-hop and new jack swing styled tracks with several film score cues at the end.

Track listing 
"This Is What We Do" - M.C. Hammer
"Spin That Wheel" - Hi Tek 3
"Family" - Riff
"9.95" - Spunkadelic
"Turtle Power" - Partners in Kryme
"Let The Walls Come Down" - Johnny Kemp
"Every Heart Needs A Home" - St. Paul
"Shredder's Suite/Ninja Thieves" - John Du Prez (omitted from UK release, this is Shredder and Foot Clan's theme)
"Splinter's Tale I & Splinter's Tale II" - John Du Prez (feat. Kevin Clash)
"Turtle Rhapsody" - Orchestra on the Half Shell
"Subway Attack/Foot Clan - John Du Prez (omitted from UK release)
"“Shredder’s Big Entrance/Crime Empire ” - John Du Prez

Certifications

References

Hip hop soundtracks
Original Motion Picture Soundtrack
1990 soundtrack albums
Superhero film soundtracks
Teenage Mutant Ninja Turtles (1990 film series)